Jurong Island Highway is a major highway in Singapore which links Jurong Pier Road in Jurong Port of the main island  to Jurong Island. It was opened in March 1999. It is also the only highway within Jurong Island.

There are plans to build a second causeway to link the Western end of Jurong Island Highway and Gul Road in Jurong Industrial Estate, Mainland Singapore but the plan was put on hold due to the possibility that the causeway might affect the passage of ships to the shipyards in the Southern part of Jurong Industrial Area.

A speed camera (limit 70 km/h) was set up in 2009 next to the CNG station.

List of interchanges

References
 Streetdirectory

Roads in Singapore
Western Islands Planning Area